The 2015 Portland State Vikings football team represented Portland State University during the 2015 NCAA Division I FCS football season. They were led by head coach Bruce Barnum and played their home games at Providence Park, with one home game at Hillsboro Stadium. They were a member of the Big Sky Conference. They finished the season 9–3, 6–2 in Big Sky play to finish in a tie for second place. They received an at-large bid to the FCS Playoffs where they lost in the second round to Northern Iowa.

On October 10, 2015, the Vikings beat North Texas, 66–7. The 59 point margin was the largest margin of victory by an FCS team over an FBS team since the split of NCAA Division I football in 1978 into the groupings now known as FBS and FCS. Portland State also became the first FCS team to defeat two FBS teams in the same season since North Dakota State in 2007.

Schedule

Game summaries

at Washington State

at Idaho State

Western Oregon

North Dakota

at North Texas

Montana State

at Cal Poly

Montana

at Northern Colorado

Southern Utah

at Eastern Washington

FCS Playoffs

Second Round–Northern Iowa

Ranking movements

References

Portland State
Portland State Vikings football seasons
Portland State
Portland State Vikings football
Portland State Vikings football